Rakthapushpam is a 1970 Indian Malayalam film,  directed by J. Sasikumar and produced by K. P. Kottarakkara. The film stars Prem Nazir, Vijayasree, Sadhana and K. R. Savithri in the lead roles. The film had musical score by M. K. Arjunan.

Cast
Prem Nazir as Shivan
Vijayasree as Rani
Sadhana as Devi
K. R. Savithri
K. P. Ummer as Kurup
Sankaradi as Pisharady 
Prema as Valli
Adoor Bhasi as Burma Nanappan
Kunchan as Jambu 
Meena as Mankamma
Govindankutty as Kannan
Padmanjali as Gouri
Rajkumar as Balan
Kamala as Rajamma
Santo Krishnan as Santo
Jose Prakash as Mooppan

Soundtrack
The music was composed by M. K. Arjunan and the lyrics were written by Sreekumaran Thampi.

References

External links
 

1970 films
1970s Malayalam-language films
Films directed by J. Sasikumar